Hsu Wen-hsiung (born 5 December 1978) is a Taiwanese baseball player who competed in the 2008 Summer Olympics.

References

1978 births
Living people
Baseball players from Kaohsiung
Olympic baseball players of Taiwan
Baseball players at the 2008 Summer Olympics